C.F. Monterrey Femenil is a Mexican professional women's football club based in Guadalupe, Nuevo León, that competes in the Liga MX Femenil. The club has been the women's section of C.F. Monterrey since 2017. The team plays its home matches at Estadio BBVA.

Monterrey Femenil is one of only four clubs that have been able to win the Liga MX Femenil title, obtaining the league title in two occasions.

The club plays a local derby known as the Clásico Regiomontano femenil against city rivals Tigres UANL.

History

Founding and First League Tournament 
Club de Fútbol Monterrey Femenil was founded on 5 December 2016, the same day that Liga MX Femenil was announced.  Gustavo Leal was appointed as the first manager of the team ahead of the first tournament of the league (Apertura 2017). Monterrey Femenil's first league match in history was a 5–2 victory at home against Necaxa on 30 July 2017.

Despite good results, Leal and the club decided to part ways on 12 October 2017. Assistant manager Eliud Contreras was appointed as interim manager for the rest of the Apertura 2017 tournament.  Monterrey ended the Apertura 2017 on the fourth place in the general standings, but didn't qualify to the playoffs due to finishing in the third place of its group with 31 pts.

Multiple league finals and first title 
After not qualifying for the playoffs in the Apertura 2017 tournament, the club decided to appoint former Monterrey player and long-time assistant manager of the men's first team, Héctor Becerra, as the new manager of the team on 5 December 2017.

Under Becerra's management, Monterrey reached its first league final in the Clausura 2018 against city rivals Tigres. This final represented the first of many Clásico Regiomontano finals to come in Liga MX Femenil. Tigres ended up defeating Monterrey on penalties (2–4)  after a 4–4 draw on aggregate.  The second leg of this final at Estadio BBVA was at the time the highest attended club match in women's football history.

Monterrey once again reached the league final in the Clausura 2019. The rival on turn was once again Tigres. Similar to the Clausura 2018, Tigres ended up winning the final again with an aggregate scoreline of 3–2.

In the Apertura 2019, Monterrey reached the final once again and for the third time, the rival was once again Tigres. Unlike the previous two finals,  Monterrey was able to win this final after defeating Tigres 2–1 on aggregate. This was the first title in history for the club.

Although the Clausura 2020 tournament was canceled by the league due to the COVID-19 pandemic, Monterrey's successful run of consecutive league finals continued in the Guard1anes 2020 tournament. Like the previous three finals that Monterrey had played, the rival in turn was once again Tigres. Unlike the previous final between these two clubs (Apertura 2019), Tigres was able to crown themselves champions after beating Monterrey on penalties (3–2) after a 1–1 draw on aggregate.

2021 to present 
After Monterrey was eliminated in the semi-finals of the Guard1anes 2021 tournament playoffs by Tigres, thus ending a run of three consecutive league finals, the club announced that Héctor Becerra was being relieved of his duties as manager on 8 June 2021, after more than three years as manager of the team. During Becerra's tenure as manager, the team won its first title in history and reach four league finals (won one and lost three). Former Pachuca manager, Eva Espejo, was appointed as the new manager of the team on 13 June 2021.

With Eva Espejo as manager, the club was able to obtain its second league title by winning the Apertura 2021 tournament after defeating Tigres on penalties (1–3) after a 2–2 draw on aggregate. As a result of Monterrey winning the Apertura 2021 league title, Espejo also became the first woman manager in history to win the Liga MX Femenil title.

On the Clausura 2022, Monterrey ended the regular phase of the tournament 1st with 43 pts, but it was eliminated in the semi-finals of the playoffs by Pachuca.

As the winner of the Apertura 2021 tournament,  Monterrey qualified to play the 2022 Campeón de Campeones final against the Clausura 2022 champions C.D. Guadalajara. Monterrey lost the final on penalties (1–3) after a 1–1 draw on aggregate.

In August 2022, Monterrey played its first international tournament when it participated on the 2022 Women's International Champions Cup. Monterrey reached the final of this tournament by beating Portland Thorns on penalties (3–2) after a 1–1 draw on regular time in the semi-finals. In the final, Monterrey was defeated by Lyon 4–0.

Grounds 

Monterrey Femenil play its home matches at the 53,500 seats Estadio BBVA. Colloquially known as "El Gigante de Acero" (Spanish for "The Steel Giant"), the stadium is located in the adjacent city of Guadalupe, part of the Greater Monterrey area.

Personnel

Club administration 

Source: C.F Monterrey

Management staff

Source: Liga MX Femenil

Managerial History

Players

Current squad
As of 2 February 2023

Honors and awards

National competitions 

Liga MX Femenil
 Winners (2): Apertura 2019, Grita México 2021.

References

Liga MX Femenil teams
 
Football clubs in Monterrey
Association football clubs established in 2017
Women's association football clubs in Mexico
C.F. Monterrey (women)
2017 establishments in Mexico